Aderkomyces sikkimensis is a species of foliicolous (leaf-dwelling) crustose lichen in the family Gomphillaceae. Found in India, it was formally described as a new species in 2006 by Athokpam Pinokiyo, Krishna Pal Singh, and Robert Lücking. The type specimen was collected by the first author from a subtropical forest near Damthang (Sikkim). It has also been recorded from the Darjeeling district of West Bengal. The specific epithet refers to the region of the type locality.

The photobiont partner is a species of Chlorococcaceae with greenish, rounded cells measuring 8–14 μm in diameter. The ascospores of Aderkomyces sikkimensis are muriform (divided into chambers), oblong to ellipsoid in shape, and measure 28–40 by 15–26 μm.

References

Ostropales
Lichen species
Lichens described in 2006
Lichens of India
Taxa named by Robert Lücking